Chickasaw Hill is a summit in the U.S. state of Mississippi.

Chickasaw Hill derives its name from the Chickasaw tribe.

References

Landforms of Panola County, Mississippi
Mountains of Mississippi
Mississippi placenames of Native American origin